Tunia may refer to:

 Tunia language, an Adamawa language of Chad
 Tunia River, a river of Colombia
 Tunia railway station, West Singhbhum district, Jharkhand, India

See also
 Tunia Baqa Shah, a village in Naushahro Feroze District, Sindh, Pakistan